Aníbal Zurdo Rodríguez (born 3 December 1982) is a Mexican professional footballer who plays as a striker. He also holds Spanish nationality.

References

External links

1982 births
Living people
People from Villahermosa
Mexican people of Spanish descent
Footballers from Tabasco
Spanish footballers
Association football forwards
Segunda División players
Segunda División B players
Tercera División players
CD Guadalajara (Spain) footballers
CD Móstoles footballers
Valencia CF Mestalla footballers
Benidorm CF footballers
CD Leganés players
CE Sabadell FC footballers
Gimnàstic de Tarragona footballers
Liga MX players
Cruz Azul footballers
C.D. Veracruz footballers
Indian Super League players
FC Pune City players
Spanish expatriate footballers
Mexican expatriate footballers
Expatriate footballers in India
Mexican footballers